Chlef is a province (wilaya) in Algeria formerly known as El Asnam, and has about 1 million inhabitants. Its capital is Chlef. Another locality is Ténès, on the Mediterranean Sea.

History
The province was originally named El Asnam until 1980 when it became known at Ech Chéliff, later known as Chlef.

In 1984, Aïn Defla Province was carved out of its territory.

Geography

Location 
The province of Chlef is located at the Western Tell 200 km west of Algiers.

Administrative divisions
The province is divided into 13 districts (daïras), which are further divided into 35 communes or municipalities.

Districts

 Abou El Hassan (دائرة أبو الحسن)
 Aïn Merane (دائرة عين مران)
 Béni Haoua (دائرة بني حواء)
 Boukadir (دائرة بوقادير)
 Chlef (دائرة شلف)
 El Karimia (دائرة الكريمية)
 El Marsa (دائرة المرسى)
 Oued Fodda (دائرة وادي الفضة)
 Ouled Ben Abdelkader (دائرة اولاد بن عبد القادر)
 Ouled Farès (دائرة اولاد فارس)
 Taougrit (دائرة تاوقريت)
 Ténès (دائرة تنس)
 Zeboudja (دائرة زبوجة)

Communes

References

External links
Chlef Province
A website about Chlef Province

 
Provinces of Algeria
States and territories established in 1974